Neotuerta is a genus of moths of the family Noctuidae. The genus was erected by Sergius G. Kiriakoff in 1977.

Species
Neotuerta platensis (Berg, 1882) Argentina, Uruguay, Venezuela
Neotuerta sabulosa (Felder, 1874) California, Mexico, Guatemala, Puerto Rico, Cuba
Neotuerta hemicycla (Hampson, 1904)
Neotuerta collectiora (Todd, 1966) Cuba, Puerto Rico, Florida
Neotuerta lycaon (H. Druce, 1897) Ecuador

References

Agaristinae